The Metropolitan Special was the workhorse passenger train of the Baltimore and Ohio Railroad (B&O) during the 1920s–1960s between St. Louis, Missouri, and New York's Rockfeller Center station.

In earlier years only the east-bound #12 carried the name, while the Diplomat (as #11) carried the west-bound direction of the route.  The train's eastern terminus was Washington, D.C.  Sleeping car passengers were able to ride trains continuously from St. Louis to Jersey City, New Jersey, where at Communipaw Terminal passengers transferred to buses and ferries to Manhattan in New York City.  By 1940, the eastern terminus became Baltimore, and the west-bound trip joined in carrying the Metropolitan Special name.

Major intermediate station stops included Washington, D.C., and Cincinnati, Ohio.  The Metropolitan Special carried vast amounts of mail and express packages in many (often 10+) baggage cars and express cars Added revenue for the train came from Railway Post Office cars, which sorted and canceled mail en route, between terminals.  Even with declining passenger revenue through the 1950s and 1960s, the B&O passenger department relied heavily on trains such as the Metropolitan Special because of the revenue generated by moving mail and express packages.  

In 1964 it was listed as primarily a mail train, and the train served various smaller towns and villages that were bypassed by the more prestigious trains along the route, the National Limited and the Diplomat.  Special was dropped from its name.  The next year the B&O dropped the sleeping car from the train.  However, by the end of 1967, the United States Postal Service dealt a heavy blow to the B&O, canceling most of its lucrative post office contracts.  With such a drop in revenue, the fate of the Metropolitan Special was sealed.  By 1969, its route was shortened to Washington to Cincinnati. The train was gone before the first day of Amtrak, May 1, 1971.

Stations

References

 

Passenger trains of the Baltimore and Ohio Railroad
Named passenger trains of the United States
Passenger rail transportation in Maryland
Passenger rail transportation in Ohio
Passenger rail transportation in Indiana
Passenger rail transportation in Missouri
Passenger rail transportation in West Virginia